Ramón Alegre Biosca (born 14 May 1981 in Barcelona, Catalonia) is a field hockey defender from Spain. He finished in fourth position with the Men's National Team at the 2004 Summer Olympics in Athens, Greece.

After having played for Laren in The Netherlands, he moved back to Spain, joining his former club Club Egara in the summer of 2005. He claimed the silver medal with the national squad at the 2008 Summer Olympics. He also competed at the 2012 Summer Olympics. His brother David is also a field hockey international for Spain.

External links
 
 London 2012 profile

1981 births
Living people
Spanish male field hockey players
Male field hockey defenders
Field hockey players from Barcelona
Olympic field hockey players of Spain
2002 Men's Hockey World Cup players
Field hockey players at the 2004 Summer Olympics
2006 Men's Hockey World Cup players
Field hockey players at the 2008 Summer Olympics
2010 Men's Hockey World Cup players
Field hockey players at the 2012 Summer Olympics
2014 Men's Hockey World Cup players
Olympic silver medalists for Spain
Medalists at the 2008 Summer Olympics
Club Egara players
SV Kampong players
Spanish expatriate sportspeople in the Netherlands
Expatriate field hockey players